Luis David Martínez (born 12 May 1989 in Lara) is a Venezuelan tennis player.

Martínez has a career high ATP singles ranking of 390 achieved on 10 February 2014. He also has a career high ATP doubles ranking of 97 achieved on 16 January 2023.

Martínez has represented Venezuela at the Davis Cup where he has a W/L record of 23–13.

Challenger and Futures finals

Singles: 5 (0–5)

Doubles: 68 (29–39)

Notes

External links

1989 births
Living people
Venezuelan male tennis players
People from Lara (state)
Tennis players at the 2015 Pan American Games
Central American and Caribbean Games medalists in tennis
Central American and Caribbean Games bronze medalists for Venezuela
Tennis players at the 2011 Pan American Games
Pan American Games competitors for Venezuela
21st-century Venezuelan people